Josh Brown (born 26 December 1993) is an Australian cricketer who plays for Brisbane Heat in the Big Bash League. He is a right-handed batsman and a right arm medium pace bowler. On 26 February 2023, he made his List A debut for the Queensland against the New South Wales in the 2022–23 Marsh One-Day Cup.

Career
Brown grew up in Brisbane and played soccer as a youth, starting cricket at age 13 he didn’t take it seriously till age 23 and progressed from third grade cricket to the Queensland Second XI in 18 months. He plays grade cricket for Northern Suburbs District Cricket Club, and in 2019 club cricket in England where he played for Histon in tne Cambridge and Hunts Premier League. His time in England including a knock of 113 from 71 balls against East Socon which including 13 6’s. In August 2022 Brown hit the second highest score ever in the Queensland T20 Max competition, when he hit 159 from 59 balls opening for Northern Districts. He makes cricket bats, including his own.

2022-23 Big Bash
Brown made his debut in the Big Bash for Brisbane Heat on 15 December, 2022 against the Melbourne Renegades. In his second match, on January 1 2023, he scored 62 runs from 23 balls and won the Player of the Match award against the Sydney Sixers. It was the fifth fastest half-century in club history, but Brown was so new to the team
he did not even have his name on the back of his kit. Commentator Adam Gilchrist described Brown as “his new favourite player” and Brown spoke of this being meaningful as he had himself taken time-off school to watch Gilchrist play at The Gabba. Brown received publicity because uniquely in modern sport he played the innings using a bat he had made himself. Brown played consistently at the top of the batting order for Brisbane Heat throughout the rest of the 2022-23 Big Bash and they reached the final against Perth Scorchers on February 4, 2023. In the final Brown opened the innings for Brisbane batting first and scored 25 from twelve balls.

References

Living people
1993 births
Australian cricketers
Brisbane Heat cricketers